Vivah Panchami (also known as Ram Vivah Ustav) is a Hindu festival celebrating the wedding of Lord Rama and Goddess Sita in the Janakpurdham which was the capital city of Mithila. It is observed on the fifth day of the Shukla paksha or waxing phase of moon in the Agrahayana month (November – December) as per Bikram Samvat 
Calendar and in the month of Mangsir. The day is observed as the Vivah Utsav of Sita and Rama in temples and sacred places associated with Sri Rama in Mithila region of Nepal and Ayodhya of India.

Observances
The day is of great importance at Janakpurdham in Nepal, where thousands of pilgrims arrive many from India and from other part of the country, as it is mentioned in the Ramayana that Sita married Rama here.

See also
Ram Navami
Mithila
 List of Hindu festivals

References

Hindu festivals
Hindu holy days
Vaishnavism
Religious festivals in India
Mithila
Hindu festivals in Nepal
November observances
December observances

External links
 Vivaha Panchami 2022 - The Divine India